XHPCDC-FM is a radio station on 92.3 FM in Ciudad del Carmen, Campeche. It is owned by NRM Comunicaciones and known as Bandolera 92.3 with a grupera format.

History
XHPCDC was awarded in the IFT-4 radio auction of 2017. NRM chairman Edilberto Huesca Perrotín paid 5.737 and 5.687 million pesos and came away with XHPCDC and XHPMEN-FM 93.9. The station signed on August 31, 2020, some six months after the transmitter began testing.

References

External links

Radio stations in Campeche
Radio stations established in 2020
2020 establishments in Mexico